Can We Get Married? is a 2012 South Korean television series starring Sung Joon, Jung So-min, Lee Mi-sook, Han Groo, and Kim Young-kwang. It aired on JTBC from October 29, 2012 to January 1, 2013 on Mondays and Tuesdays at 23:00 (KST) time slot for 20 episodes. The romantic comedy realistically explores the themes of love, marriage and family against the backdrop of a young couple preparing to get married in 100 days.

Synopsis
The drama revolves around 3 couples, who experience different things in their relationships.

Cast
 Sung Joon as Jung-hoon (28)
 Jung So-min as Hye-yoon (28)
 Kim Sung-min as Do-hyun (42)
 Jung Ae-yeon as Hye-jin (30)
 Lee Mi-sook as Deul-ja (52)
 Sunwoo Eun-sook as Eun-kyung (50)
 Kang Seok-woo as Dong-gun (50)
 Kim Young-kwang as Ki-joong (32)
 Han Groo as Dong-bi (28)
 Kim Jin-soo as Min-ho (43)
 Choi Hwa-jung as Deul-rae (50)
 Lee Jae-won as Sang-jin (32)
 Jin Ye-sol as Chae-young (25)
 Choi Ji-hun as Yoo-ri (23)
 Hwang Jae-won as Nam Tae-won (7)
 Kim Ji-sook as Ki-joong's mother
 Seo Ji-yeon as Director Kim
 Lee Jae-yong as Dong-bi's father

Awards and nominations
2013 49th Baeksang Arts Awards
 Nomination - Best Screenplay (TV) - Ha Myung-hee

International broadcast
 Japan: TBS - 2013.
 Thailand: PPTV - 2014.
 Vietnam: VTV3 - March 8, 2014.
 Chile: Via X Channel - 2015.

References

External links
  
 
 

2012 South Korean television series debuts
2013 South Korean television series endings
JTBC television dramas
Korean-language television shows
South Korean romantic comedy television series
Television series by Drama House